Philip D. Fortunato (born 1953 or 1954) is an American businessman and politician serving as a member of the Washington State Senate, representing the 31st district, based in southeast King County and northeast Pierce County since 2017. A member of the Republican Party, he previously served as a member of the Washington House of Representatives, representing the 47th district from 1999 to 2001 and ran for Governor of Washington in the 2020 election, coming in sixth place in the primary with just under 4% of the vote.

Personal life 

Fortunato and his wife Suzanne have five children. Fortunato and his family live in Auburn, Washington.

References

External links
Official page at the Washington Legislature
Campaign site

Phil Fortunato at Ballotpedia

Living people
People from Auburn, Washington
Rutgers University alumni
Republican Party Washington (state) state senators
Republican Party members of the Washington House of Representatives
20th-century American politicians
21st-century American politicians
Year of birth missing (living people)
Candidates in the 2020 United States elections